Ron Hornaday may refer to:

Ron Hornaday Sr. (1931–2008), American racing driver and NASCAR Pacific Coast Series Champion
Ron Hornaday Jr. (born 1958), American racing driver and NASCAR Truck Series Champion
Ron Hornaday III (born 1979), American racing driver